Kaza Kingsley is an author most known for the children's fantasy series Erec Rex. She was born in Cleveland, Ohio and currently resides in Cincinnati, Ohio. Kingsley is a physician by training.

Erec Rex series
Kingsley self-published the first two titles then was signed up for a proposed eight title series by Simon & Schuster in 2008.
Erec Rex: The Dragon's Eye (2006) - "...  this light but not insubstantial outing definitely belongs aboard the Potter wagon, but merits a seat toward the front."
Erec Rex: The Monsters of Otherness (2007) - "Though Kingsley crafts a distractingly choppy, episodic plot with some familiar elements, it’s buoyed up by unusually clever details..."
Erec Rex: The Search For Truth (2009) - "Kingsley compensates for a tendency to trot in omniscient helpers by keeping her tongue firmly in cheek ... her tale continues to tumble along briskly and will please fans of the less earnest fantasists."
Erec Rex : The Three Furies (2010)
Erec Rex: the Secret of Ashona (2012)

References

External links
 Official Site

Living people
Year of birth missing (living people)
American children's writers